The following is a list of the lieutenant governors of Alberta. Though the present-day office of lieutenant governor in Alberta came into being only upon the province's entry into Canadian Confederation in 1905, the post is a continuation from the first governorship of the Northwest Territories in 1869.

List

See also
 Office-holders of Canada
 Canadian incumbents by year

References

External links
 

Alberta

Lieutenant Governors